USS Sea Otter (SP-781) was a United States Navy patrol vessel in commission from 1917 to 1919.

Sea Otter was built as a private wooden motorboat of the same name in either 1911 or 1913 by Britt Brothers at Lynn, Massachusetts. On 11 June 1917, the U.S. Navy acquired her from her owner, Hugh L. Willoughby of Newport, Rhode Island, for use as a section patrol boat during World War I. She was commissioned the same day as USS Sea Otter (SP-781).

Sea Otter performed transportation and supply duties in United States East Coast ports for the rest of World War I.

Decommissioned sometime after the end of the war, Sea Otter was stricken from the Navy List on 7 November 1919 and sold to Joseph Guild of Boston, Massachusetts, on 16 January 1920.

Notes

References

Department of the Navy Naval History and Heritage Command Online Library of Selected Images: U.S. Navy Ships: USS Sea Otter (SP-781), 1917-1919
NavSource Online: Section Patrol Craft Photo Archive Sea Otter (SP 781)

Patrol vessels of the United States Navy
World War I patrol vessels of the United States
Ships built in Lynn, Massachusetts
1911 ships
1913 ships